James Thompson (October 1, 1806 – January 28, 1874) was a lawyer, politician and jurist from Pennsylvania. He served in the United States Congress and in the Pennsylvania House of Representatives, where he was Speaker in 1835. He also served as a federal judge and as a member of the Supreme Court of Pennsylvania.

Life and career
Thompson was born in Middlesex Township, Butler County, Pennsylvania on October 1, 1806.  After learning the printing trade, Thompson studied law.  He was admitted to the bar in 1829 and practiced as a lawyer in Erie, Pennsylvania.

Thompson served in the Pennsylvania House of Representatives from 1832–1834 and in 1855 and served as Speaker in 1834.

He was a delegate to the State constitutional convention in 1838, and the presiding judge of the sixth judicial district court from 1838 until 1844, when he was elected as a Democrat to the United States House of Representatives.

Congress
Thompson served in the Twenty-ninth, Thirtieth, and Thirty-first Congresses, from  March 4, 1845 until March 3, 1851.  He was the chairman of the U.S. House Committee on the Judiciary during his second term. In the 31st Congress, Thompson became the first recorded Democratic Caucus Chairman and the first official chairman of any party caucus in either house of Congress.

Pennsylvania Supreme Court
Thompson did not run for reelection in 1850, but instead returned to practicing law.  He became an associate justice of the Supreme Court of Pennsylvania from 1857 to 1866, and served as chief justice of that court from 1866 to 1872.

Later career and death
He returned to private practice until his death in Philadelphia on January 28, 1874.

Thompson is interred in Woodlands Cemetery.

References

The Political Graveyard

Democratic Party members of the Pennsylvania House of Representatives
Pennsylvania lawyers
Chief Justices of Pennsylvania
Democratic Party members of the United States House of Representatives from Pennsylvania
1806 births
1874 deaths
19th-century American politicians
Burials at The Woodlands Cemetery
19th-century American judges
19th-century American lawyers